The 2019 Towson Tigers football team represented Towson University in the 2019 NCAA Division I FCS football season. They were led by eleventh-year head coach Rob Ambrose and played their home games at Johnny Unitas Stadium. They were a member of the Colonial Athletic Association. They finished the season 7–5, 4–4 in CAA play to finish in a four-way tie for fifth place.

Previous season

The Tigers finished the 2018 season 7–5, 5–3 in CAA play to finish in a three-way tie for third place. They received an at-large bid to the FCS Playoffs where they lost in the first round to Duquesne.

Preseason

CAA poll
In the CAA preseason poll released on July 23, 2019, the Tigers were predicted to finish in second place.

Preseason All–CAA team
The Tigers had five players selected to the preseason all-CAA team.

Offense

Tom Flacco – QB

Shane Simpson – RB

Shane Leatherbury – WR

Defense

Robert Heyward – LB

Special teams

Aidan O'Neill – K

Schedule

Game summaries

at The Citadel

North Carolina Central

at Maine

at Villanova

at Florida

Albany

Bucknell

at James Madison

Delaware

at Stony Brook

at William & Mary

Elon

Ranking movements

References

Towson
Towson Tigers football seasons
Towson Tigers football